Josef (Franz) Madlmayer (10 April 1907 – 20 March 1945) was an Austrian international footballer.

After his playing years he became a football coach for the Swiss football club FC Frauenfeld in Frauenfeld. 1939 after the beginning of World War II he returned to Austria. He fell in battle in Enkenbach near Dahn (Germany).

References

1907 births
1945 deaths
Association football midfielders
Austrian footballers
Austria international footballers
SK Rapid Wien players
AS Cannes players
Ligue 1 players
Austrian military personnel killed in World War II
Austrian expatriate footballers
Austrian expatriate sportspeople in France